Benham is an Anglo-Scottish locational surname, from Benham, Berkshire, or Binham, Norfolk. Notable people with the surname include:

 Andrew E. K. Benham (1832-1905), American admiral
 Charles Benham (1860-1929) Author, newspaper editor and amateur scientist
 Chris Benham, cricketer
 Ellen Ida Benham (1871–1917) science teacher in South Australia.
 Flip Benham, Christian fundamentalist
 Henry Washington Benham, 19th-century American soldier
 Isabel Benham (1901–2013), American railroad finance expert
 Jade Benham, Australian politician
 Jane Benham Hay (born 1829), English artist
 Jessica Benham, American politician and disability rights activist
 Joan Benham, actress.
 John Lee Benham (1785–1864), founder of Benham & Sons of Wigmore Street, London, cooking apparatus manufacturers
 Edward Benham (died 1869), son of the above and founder of Benham & Co., printers of Colchester, Essex. Editor of Essex County Standard
 Sir William Gurney Benham (1859–1944), elder son of the above, and his successor as proprietor of Benham & Co. Prolific author, High Steward of Colchester. Editor of Essex County Standard
 Hervey Benham (1910–1987), his son. Author, particularly on marine topics. Editor of Essex County Standard
 Jane Benham MBE (c. 1943 – 1992), his daughter, restorer of boats and associated
 Charles Edwin Benham (1860–1929) of Colchester, Essex, journalist, author (particularly Essex ballads, 1st ed., 1895), and experimenter. Younger son of Edward, creator of Benham's top. Editor of Essex County Standard
 Robert Benham (judge), Georgia Supreme Court Judge
 Captain Robert Benham, early American pioneer, member of First Ohio Legislature
 William Benham (1831–1910), English churchman and writer.
 William Blaxland Benham (1860–1950), New Zealand zoologist and biologist
 William Gurney Benham (1859–1944), English newspaper editor

See also 
 
 Benham (disambiguation)

References 

English toponymic surnames